Runtuy (Quechua for "to hail" or "to lay an egg") is a mountain in the eastern extensions of the Cordillera Blanca in the Andes of Peru which reaches a height of approximately . It is located in the Ancash Region, Huari Province, Huari District, northwest of Huari.

References

Mountains of Peru
Mountains of Ancash Region